Richard Dawson (19 January 1960 – 9 August 2020) was an English former professional footballer who made his professional debut representing Rotherham United in 1978.

Playing career
Dawson began his playing career at Rotherham United. After making twenty-one league starts and a further three as a substitute and netting three times he was poached by local rivals Doncaster Rovers in February 1981 to help with their 1980-81 promotion push. He made his debut in a home win against Hereford United with Doncaster Rovers winning three goals to one. In his first season with Doncaster Rovers they won promotion from Division Four, with Dawson finding the back of the net six times before the end of the season. During the 1981–1982 season he was Doncaster Rovers' top scorer with eight in all competitions. His home team Chesterfield signed Dawson in 1983 on a series of monthly contracts to help dig them out of a hole. The club's circumstances at the time made it difficult for Richard to make a good go of it and he signed for Scarborough in December 1982

Personal life
After ending his playing career in 1988 Dick became a HGV truck driver, During the 90's he drove for the same firm as former Sunderland legend Joe Bolton and Sheffield United goal machine Keith Edwards.

References

1960 births
Living people
Footballers from Chesterfield
English footballers
Association football forwards
Rotherham United F.C. players
Doncaster Rovers F.C. players
Chesterfield F.C. players
Scarborough F.C. players
Gainsborough Trinity F.C. players
Kettering Town F.C. players
Matlock Town F.C. players
Boston United F.C. players
English Football League players